Marland is a town in Noble County, Oklahoma, United States. The population was 225 at the 2010 census. It was named for Ernest W. Marland, an oilman from nearby Ponca City who later became a governor of Oklahoma. Marland is on SH-156, south-southwest of Ponca City.

History
Marland began as a community named "Bliss," a shipping point on the Atchison, Topeka and Santa Fe Railway (often called simply the Santa Fe). The surrounding countryside, formerly part of the Ponca reservation, had been leased for cattle grazing and was part of the Miller Brothers 101 Ranch. The brothers built stockyards adjacent to the railroad on the south side of their ranch for shipping cattle. A community began forming nearby, with grain elevator, a lumber yard and a general store. The Millers platted a town on the east side of the tracks in 1906 and began selling lots.

The population continued to grow, reaching 250 residents.

In the 1920s, oil discovered by Ernest W. Marland in the nearby Three Sands Field helped the town, leading to the April 1922 election and town name change to Marland. But the Great Depression of the 1930s bankrupted the Miller Brothers ranch, and the Three Sands Field went dry, stunting further town growth.

Geography
Marland is located at  (36.560363, -97.151777).

Demographics

As of the census of 2000, there were 280 people, 83 households, and 65 families residing in the town. There were 98 housing units at an average density of 369.1 per square mile (140.1/km2). The racial makeup of the town was 48.93% White, 38.57% Native American, 3.21% from other races, and 9.29% from two or more races. Hispanic or Latino of any race were 10.00% of the population.

There were 83 households, out of which 47.0% had children under the age of 18 living with them, 56.6% were married couples living together, 15.7% had a female householder with no husband present, and 20.5% were non-families. 15.7% of all households were made up of individuals, and 6.0% had someone living alone who was 65 years of age or older. The average household size was 3.37 and the average family size was 3.86.

In the town, the population was spread out, with 41.4% under the age of 18, 7.9% from 18 to 24, 26.1% from 25 to 44, 18.9% from 45 to 64, and 5.7% who were 65 years of age or older. The median age was 25 years. For every 100 females, there were 97.2 males. For every 100 females age 18 and over, there were 95.2 males.

The median income for a household in the town was $27,188, and the median income for a family was $25,625. Males had a median income of $26,563 versus $18,000 for females. The per capita income for the town was $8,918. About 31.0% of families and 37.9% of the population were below the poverty line, including 49.6% of those under the age of eighteen and 27.3% of those 65 or over.

References

Towns in Noble County, Oklahoma
Towns in Oklahoma